Hamburg-Tonndorf station is a railway station in the Tonndorf district in the city of Hamburg, Germany.

References

Tonndorf